The next Ukrainian Census will be conducted by the State Statistics Service of Ukraine. The 2001 census was the most recent, and the only census conducted in independent Ukraine to date. The next census was to have been held ten years later, in 2011 (censuses should be conducted every ten years, according to standards set by the United Nations). However, the next census has been regularly delayed and is now scheduled for 2023.

The 2001 census recorded the population of Ukraine as 48,457,100 people. By May 2021, that population had dropped down to 41,442,615
(excluding Crimea and Sevastopol).

History
In September 2013, the second Azarov Government set the census' date for 2016. In December 2015, the second Yatsenyuk Government postponed it to 2020. In October 2019, the State Statistics Service of Ukraine confirmed that the national census was planned to be held from 10 November to 23 December 2020. But in April 2020, Minister of the Cabinet of Ministers Oleh Nemchinov said there would be no census in 2020 and probably not in 2021, because the census was "an expensive endeavour." Nemchinov stated in December 2020, that the next census was planned for 2023.

See also
 Censuses in Ukraine
 Demographics of Ukraine

References

External links